Santa Teresa is a census-designated place (CDP) in Dona Ana County, New Mexico, United States. It is home to the Santa Teresa Port of Entry and is part of the Las Cruces Metropolitan Statistical Area, although geographically it is considerably closer to El Paso, Texas than to Las Cruces. While the United States Census Bureau has defined Santa Teresa as a CDP, the census definition of the area may not precisely correspond to local understanding of the area with the same name. The population was 4,258 at the 2010 census.

History
In 2015, the community of Santa Teresa petitioned the Doña Ana County Board of Commissioners to incorporate it as a city. When Sunland Park proposed annexing Santa Teresa, every Board member agreed that Sunland Park had no jurisdiction over Santa Teresa, whereupon Sunland Park filed an appeal to that decision with the New Mexico Supreme Court.

Geography
Santa Teresa is located at  (31.853273, -106.641302).

Demographics

As of the census of 2000, there were 2,607 people, 952 households, and 755 families residing in the CDP. The population density was 238.0 people per square mile (91.9/km). There were 1,007 housing units at an average density of 91.9 per square mile (35.5/km). The racial makeup of the CDP was 82.09% White, 1.19% African American, 0.65% Native American, 0.38% Asian, 0.23% Pacific Islander, 13.04% from other races, and 2.42% from two or more races. Hispanic or Latino of any race were 55.58% of the population.

There were 952 households, out of which 40.0% had children under the age of 18 living with them, 68.0% were married couples living together, 8.3% had a female householder with no husband present, and 20.6% were non-families. 17.4% of all households were made up of individuals, and 5.4% had someone living alone who was 65 years of age or older. The average household size was 2.74 and the average family size was 3.11.

In the CDP, the population was spread out, with 27.8% under the age of 18, 6.0% from 18 to 24, 31.8% from 25 to 44, 22.6% from 45 to 64, and 11.9% who were 65 years of age or older. The median age was 36 years. For every 100 females, there were 94.8 males. For every 100 females age 18 and over, there were 92.5 males.

The median income for a household in the CDP was $61,500, and the median income for a family was $66,833. Males had a median income of $43,500 versus $30,326 for females. The per capita income for the CDP was $24,561. About 2.2% of families and 1.6% of the population were below the poverty line, including 0.7% of those under age 18 and none of those age 65 or over.

Education

The Gadsden Independent School District operates public schools, including
 Santa Teresa High School
 Santa Teresa Middle School
 Santa Teresa Elementary School

Infrastructure
Water is supplied by the Camino Real Regional Utility Authority. 

The community is served by the Doña Ana County International Jetport.

See also

 List of census-designated places in New Mexico

References

External links

 Union Pacific Santa Teresa Intermodal Terminal

Census-designated places in Doña Ana County, New Mexico
Census-designated places in New Mexico
Populated places in Doña Ana County, New Mexico